Kyrkjebakken Slope is an ice slope on the west side of Jøkulkyrkja Mountain, in the Mühlig-Hofmann Mountains of Queen Maud Land, Antarctica. It was plotted from surveys and air photos by the Sixth Norwegian Antarctic Expedition (1956–60) and named Kyrkjebakken (the church hill).

References

Ice slopes of Queen Maud Land
Princess Astrid Coast